The 1994 Masters Tournament was the 58th Masters Tournament, held April 7–10 at Augusta National Golf Club in Augusta, Georgia.

José María Olazábal won the first of his two Masters titles, two strokes ahead of runner-up Tom Lehman, and became the sixth winner from Europe in the past seven Masters. Olazábal was the second champion from Spain, following Seve Ballesteros, the winner in 1980 and 1983.

Larry Mize, the 1987 champion, led after each of the first two  rounds, and Lehman assumed the 54-hole lead with one of two 69s on Saturday; Olazábal had the other and was one stroke back, with Mize one behind in third. Lehman, age 35, had yet to win on the PGA Tour.

In the final round, Olazábal, Lehman, and Mize shared the lead entering the back nine. Mize made three bogeys coming home and fell out of contention. Lehman bogeyed the par-3 12th to fall a stroke back, and at the par-5 15th hole, both Olazábal and Lehman had putts for eagle.

After pars at 16, Olazábal three-putted from off the 17th green for bogey, while Lehman missed a birdie from fifteen feet, and the lead was reduced to one at the final tee. Lehman's one-iron found the left fairway bunker, the approach shot was well short of the green, and he bogeyed; Olazábal put his approach into the gallery, but he scrambled for par and had a two-stroke 

Fred Couples, the 1992 champion, did not enter due to back problems, withdrawing the previous Friday. Olazábal won his second green jacket five years later in 1999. Lehman won his first tour event six weeks later at the Memorial, and won a major  at The Open Championship in 1996.

Course

Field
1. Masters champions
Tommy Aaron, Seve Ballesteros (9), Gay Brewer, Billy Casper, Charles Coody, Ben Crenshaw (12), Nick Faldo (3,11), Raymond Floyd (9,10), Doug Ford, Bernhard Langer (13), Sandy Lyle (9), Larry Mize (9,12,13), Jack Nicklaus, Arnold Palmer, Gary Player, Craig Stadler (12,13), Tom Watson (10,11), Ian Woosnam (9), Fuzzy Zoeller (9)

Fred Couples (9,10,13) did not play due to back problems
George Archer, Jack Burke Jr., Bob Goalby, Ben Hogan, Herman Keiser, Cary Middlecoff, Byron Nelson, Henry Picard, Gene Sarazen, Sam Snead, and Art Wall Jr. did not play.

2. U.S. Open champions (last five years)
Hale Irwin (11), Lee Janzen (13), Tom Kite (13), Payne Stewart (4,9,10,13), Curtis Strange

3. The Open champions (last five years)
Mark Calcavecchia (9,13), Ian Baker-Finch, Greg Norman (11,12,13)

4. PGA champions (last five years)
John Daly (9), Wayne Grady, Nick Price (10,12,13)

Paul Azinger (10,12,13) did not play

5. U.S. Amateur champion and runner-up
Danny Ellis (a), John Harris (a)

6. The Amateur champion
Iain Pyman (a)

7. U.S. Amateur Public Links champion

David Berganio Jr. forfeited his exemption by turning professional

8. U.S. Mid-Amateur champion
Jeff Thomas (a)

9. Top 24 players and ties from the 1993 Masters
Chip Beck (13), Russ Cochran, Steve Elkington (13), Brad Faxon, Anders Forsbrand, Dan Forsman, Tom Lehman, Jeff Maggert (12,13), José María Olazábal, Mark O'Meara, Corey Pavin (12,13), Scott Simpson (11,12,13), Jeff Sluman (10), Howard Twitty, Lanny Wadkins

10. Top 16 players and ties from the 1993 U.S. Open
John Adams, David Edwards (12,13), Ernie Els, Fred Funk, Nolan Henke (11,12), Scott Hoch (11,12), Barry Lane, Craig Parry, Loren Roberts (12), Mike Standly

11. Top eight players and ties from 1993 PGA Championship
John Cook, Bob Estes, Dudley Hart, Vijay Singh (12,13)

Phil Mickelson (12,13) did not play

12. Winners of PGA Tour events since the previous Masters
Fulton Allem (13), Jim Gallagher Jr. (13), Bill Glasson, David Frost (13), Jay Haas (13), John Huston (13), John Inman, Davis Love III (13), Andrew Magee, Billy Mayfair (13), Blaine McCallister, Jim McGovern (13), Johnny Miller, Brett Ogle, Grant Waite

Rocco Mediate (13) did not play

13. Top 30 players from the 1993 PGA Tour money list
Rick Fehr, Gil Morgan

14. Special foreign invitation
Peter Baker, Hajime Meshiai, Colin Montgomerie, Masashi Ozaki, Costantino Rocca, Sam Torrance

Round summaries

First round
Thursday, April 7, 1994

Source:

Second round
Friday, April 8, 1994

Amateurs: Harris (+4), Ellis (+6), Thomas (+12), Pyman (+17)

Third round
Saturday, April 9, 1994

Final round
Sunday, April 10, 1994

Final leaderboard

Sources:

Scorecard

Cumulative tournament scores, relative to par

Source:

References

External links
Masters.com – past winners and results
Augusta.com – 1994 Masters leaderboard and scorecards

1994
1994 in golf
1994 in American sports
1994 in Georgia (U.S. state)
April 1994 sports events in the United States